Josee Wouters was a female international table tennis player from Belgium.

She won a bronze medal at the 1947 World Table Tennis Championships in the women's doubles with Mary Detournay.

See also
 List of table tennis players
 List of World Table Tennis Championships medalists

References

Belgian female table tennis players
World Table Tennis Championships medalists